John van Nost the younger (1713-1780) was the nephew of the noted Flemish-born British sculptor John van Nost and a noteworthy sculptor in his own right.

Life

He was born around 1712 in Piccadilly, London and was apprenticed to Henry Scheemakers in 1726. It is also highly likely that some training was at the direct hand of his uncle. It is probable that they worked together on pieces during his time in London from 1725 to 1729.

Little is known of his time from 1729 to 1749, but it is presumed that he worked in Britain, continuing on his uncle's name and reputation.

In 1750, he moved to Dublin in Ireland and, having little competition, appears to have had a monopoly of commissions in the area. In 1763, he was known to have a studio in a garden on the south side of St Stephen's Green in Dublin.

He made various trips to London, staying there 1776 until 1780.

Whilst some references are made to his "death" in 1780 this date appears to simply mark his return to Dublin, and died there in 1787.

Works
Statue of George II, St Stephen's Green (1756) (erected 2 January 1758)
Statue of George II at the front of Weavers' Hall, Dublin
Bust of George III (1764) (now in the British Museum)
Statue of George III, Dublin City Hall (1765) (now in the National Gallery of Ireland)
Monument to Viscount Loftus, New Ross, County Wexford, Ireland (1768)
Bust of Thomas Prior
Bust of Samuel Madden
Bust of David Garrick (much copied)
Statue of George, Earl of Bristol, Down Hill, Northern Ireland (1778)
Often attributed to him is a metal bust of the Prussian king Frederick the Great created by his apprentice Patrick Cunningham, installed in a niche on a house for the renaming of the former Cabragh Lane to Prussia Street in Stoneybatter, Dublin.

References

External links
http://www.parksandgardens.org/places-and-people/person/1005

1787 deaths
Irish sculptors
Sculptors from London
British people of Flemish descent